The Urucu–Manaus pipeline is a natural gas pipeline in Brazil. It allows use of the natural gas from Urucu, which is the largest onshore natural gas reserve in Brazil.  The gas is used to substitute diesel and fuel oil for the electricity production in the state of Amazonas, and the pipeline supplies cities of Coari, Codajás, Anori, Anamã, Caapiranga, Manacapuru, Iranduba, and Manaus.  The pipeline was inaugurated on 26 November 2009, and it is operated by Transportadora Urucu-Manaus S.A., a subsidiary of Petrobras.

Sections
The second section connects Coari and Anamã and third section connects Anamã-Manaus. In addition to the main trunkline, the pipeline has seven branches.

Technical features
The construction of the pipeline was completed in October 2009.  In the first stage of its operation, the pipeline is transporting 17 billion cubic meters (bcm) of natural gas per year.  The initial capacity of the pipeline is 20 bcm of natural gas per year.

See also

 Urucu Oil Province

References

Natural gas pipelines in Brazil
Buildings and structures in Amazonas (Brazilian state)
Petrobras
Energy infrastructure completed in 2009
2009 establishments in Brazil